Giraud is a surname. It is a variant of the Proto-Germanic name Gerard, meaning spear-strong.

Notable people with this surname

 Albert Giraud (1860–1929), Belgian poet
 Alexis Giraud-Teulon (1839–1916), French academic, lawyer and translator
 Brigitte Giraud (born 1960), French writer
 Charles Giraud (1802–81), French lawyer and politician
 Claude Giraud (1936-2020), French actor
 Georges Giraud (1889–1943), French mathematician
 Giovanni Giraud (1776–1834), Italian dramatist
 Henri Giraud (1879–1949), French general during World War I and World War II
 Hubert Giraud (composer) (1920–2016), French composer and lyricist
 Jean Giraud (1938–2012), French comics artist
 Jean Giraud (mathematician) (1936–2007), French mathematician
 Jean-Baptiste Giraud (1752–1830), French sculptor
 Joyce Giraud (born 1975), Puerto Rican actress, two time Miss Puerto Rico, Miss Universe 1998 2nd runner-up, and Real Housewives of Beverly Hills star
 Matt Giraud (born 1985), American singer, musician and finalist of American Idol Season 8
 Nicolo Giraud (c. 1795 – ?), Greek companion of the poet Lord Byron
 René Girard (1904–1968), French scientist-historian
 Robert Giraud (1921–1997), French poet and journalist
 Théophile de Giraud (born 1968), Belgian writer, philosopher and activist
 Yvette Giraud (born 1916), French singer

See also
 Girod
 Girard (disambiguation)
 Guiraud
 Girault

References

French-language surnames